Elections to the Supreme Soviet were held in the Soviet Union on 10 February 1946. According to Soviet law, 325,000 out of an eligible adult population of 101,718,000 were disenfranchised for various reasons. This election was the first in which a 1945 decree allowed members of the Red Army stationed outside the Soviet Union to vote for both chambers of the Supreme Soviet in special 100,000-member districts, a practice which would continue for decades with the Red Army presence in the Eastern bloc.

Results

Soviet of the Union

Soviet of Nationalities

References

The Distinctiveness of Soviet Law. Ferdinand Joseph Maria Feldbrugge, ed. Martinus Nijhoff Publishers: Dordrecht (1987): 110-112.

Legislative elections in the Soviet Union
Legislative
One-party elections
Single-candidate elections
Soviet
Soviet Union
Soviet Union